Syzygium legatii, the mountain waterberry, is a species of flowering plant in the family Myrtaceae, native to the Northern Provinces of South Africa. A small tree, it is typically found in rocky grasslands and savannas, often on quartzite soils.

References

legatii
Endemic flora of South Africa
Flora of the Northern Provinces
Plants described in 1926